The 1945 Northern Ireland general election was held on 14 June 1945.  The election saw significant losses for the Ulster Unionist Party, though they retained their majority.

Mirroring the result across the rest of the UK in the 1945 UK general election, candidates standing on behalf of the various Labour parties won a significantly higher vote share of 30%, but this translated into just two new MPs due to the first-past-the-post electoral system.

Results

|}

Electorate: 845,964 (509,098 in contested seats); Turnout: 70.3% (357,882).

Votes summary

Seats summary

Footnotes
<noinclude>

See also
1945 United Kingdom general election

References
Northern Ireland Parliamentary Election Results 

1945
1945 elections in the United Kingdom
June 1945 events in the United Kingdom
1945 elections in Northern Ireland